Self-attention can mean:
 Attention (machine learning), a machine learning technique
 self-attention, an attribute of natural cognition
Self Attention, also called intra Attention, is an attention mechanism relating different positions of a single sequence in order to compute a representation of the same sequence. It has been shown to be very useful in machine reading, abstractive summarization, or image description generation.